Ingrow is a suburb of Keighley, West Yorkshire, England that lies on the River Worth. The name Ingrow comes from Old Scandinavian which means 'corner of land in the meadow.'

The Ingrow Railway Centre has two railway museums: the Museum of Rail Travel owned by Vintage Carriages Trust, and Ingrow Loco, owned by the Bahamas Locomotive Society.

Between 1884 and 1955 Ingrow had a second railway station (Ingrow East), adjacent to, but  higher than the current railway station. This station was on the Great Northern route between Keighley, Halifax and Bradford Exchange.

The area is served by the grade II listed parish church of St John the Evangelist, which was built in 1843 to serve the parish of Ingrow with Hainworth.

See also
Listed buildings in Keighley

References

External links 

 Ingrow Museum of Rail Travel - Vintage Carriages Trust 
 Ingrow Loco Museum - Bahamas Locomotive Society

Geography of the City of Bradford
Keighley